Robert Maskew Cowper (born 5 October 1940) is a former cricketer who played Test cricket for Australia from 1964 to 1968, and Sheffield Shield cricket for Victoria and Western Australia from 1960 to 1970.

Cricket career
Bob Cowper was the son of Dave Cowper, who captained the Australia national rugby union team in the 1930s. Bob was educated at Scotch College, Melbourne, and began playing for Hawthorn-East Melbourne in 1958. Two years later he was in the Victorian side.

A tall, correct left-handed batsmen, Cowper scored heavily for Victoria in the 1962–63 and 1963–64 seasons and was selected to tour England in 1964. He was successful in the county matches but not in his first Test at Headingley. He took part in Australia's next tour, to the West Indies in 1964-65, when he "displayed courage, a cool temperament and fine technique in dealing with the hostile pace of Hall and Griffith". He was Australia's leading run-scorer in the Test series, with 417 runs at an average of 52.12, including centuries in the Second and Fourth Tests.

He was dropped in the 1965–66 Ashes series for slow scoring. When he was recalled for the Fifth Test at Melbourne he made the first Test triple-century in Australia: 307 from 589 balls in 727 minutes. Matthew Hayden's 380 against Zimbabwe in 2002–03 is now the highest Test century in Australia, but Cowper's remains the longest.

After his triple-century he was never omitted from the Test side until a hand injury forced him out of the Fifth Test in 1968. In the last 13 matches of his Test career (the 1966–67, 1967–68, and 1968 series) he scored 931 runs at 38.79 and took 31 wickets at 25.22. In those 13 matches no other Australian player exceeded 800 runs, and only Graham McKenzie, with 49, took more wickets. Cowper was only 27 when he played his last Test, at Headingley in 1968, almost exactly four years after his first, at Headingley in 1964.

He captained Victoria to victory in the Sheffield Shield in 1969–70, then left cricket altogether to concentrate on his business career.

Remarkably, he averaged an impressive 75.78 in home Tests but only 33.33 overseas.  The difference of 42.45 is a Test record.

Later career
Since retiring from playing, Cowper has had a successful career in big business, and has also served as a cricket referee. In 1977 he joined the administrative board of World Series Cricket. In the 1980s he moved to Monaco.

He was awarded life membership of Cricket Victoria in 2018.

See also
 List of Victoria first-class cricketers
 List of Western Australia first-class cricketers

References

External links
 

1940 births
Living people
Australia Test cricketers
Victoria cricketers
Western Australia cricketers
People educated at Scotch College, Melbourne
Australian cricketers
Cricketers from Melbourne
Marylebone Cricket Club cricketers
People from Kew, Victoria